Kohurestan (also Romanized as Kohūrestān, Kahoorestān, and Kahūrestān; also known as Khūrīstān, Gūrestān, and Kūristān) is a village in Kohurestan Rural District, in the Central District of Khamir County, Hormozgan Province, Iran. At the 2006 census, its population was 2,525, in 544 families.

References 

Populated places in Khamir County